Doboj East is a municipality located in Tuzla Canton of the Federation of Bosnia and Herzegovina, an entity of Bosnia and Herzegovina. It was created after the Dayton peace agreements in 1998 by seceding from the municipality of Doboj. Today Doboj East is experiencing rapid urbanization, as well as economic and industrial growth. One reason for this occurrence might be the fact that the municipality is situated on the crossroads of several other rapidly developing or developed areas of Bosnia.

Geography 
Doboj East is situated between the cities of Gračanica to the east and the city of Doboj to the west. To the south lies the Spreča river which also serves as the municipalities edge and subsequent border with Petrovo, Bosnia and Herzegovina. The Spreča valley covers the southern half of the municipality where the ground is very fertile thus the area is mostly agricultural plots. Going north the elevation starts rising and the terrain is much hillier, this represents the southern part of the Trebava mountain.

Localities
Doboj East is composed of 5 small towns: Brijesnica Mala, Brijesnica Velika, Klokotnica, Lukavica Rijeka, and Stanić Rijeka, of which Klokotnica represents the seat of the municipality.

Population

The population density of Doboj East is around 260/km² which, if we didn't count the cities of Sarajevo and Tuzla, makes Doboj East the third most densely populated municipality in Bosnia right behind Teočak and Doboj South. Almost all of the residents are Bosniaks(96%), with the rest being Other(4%).

History 
The area of present-day Doboj East was populated since the Middle Ages, and according to some written documents the first time Brijesnica Mala and Klokotnica were mentioned is in 1528. and Lukavica Rijeka and Stanić Rijeka in 1533.

Economy 
The main industries in Doboj East are agriculture, textile industry and food industry.

Tourism 
Most tourists come to Doboj East for hunting, fishing and adventure tourism.

See also
Tuzla Canton

References

External links
Official site